Ray Smith Poole (April 15, 1921 – April 2, 2008) was an American offensive and defensive end in the National Football League who played for the New York Giants from 1947 to 1952.

Born in Gloster, Mississippi, he graduated from Crosby High School in Crosby, Mississippi, then attended the University of North Carolina before transferring to the University of Mississippi. He also played baseball and basketball at Ole Miss, where his brothers Barney and Buster also became star athletes. Ray Poole was selected by the Giants in the 13th round of the 1944 NFL Draft while he was serving three years in the Marines during World War II. He returned to play at Ole Miss before joining the NFL. He was named to the all-NFL team in 1950.

He later played for the Montreal Alouettes of the Canadian Football League in 1953–54, and then became an assistant coach at Ole Miss under coach Johnny Vaught. He coached at Ole Miss from 1955 to 1974, then served as head coach at Northwest Mississippi Community College for the 1979 and 1980 seasons.

Poole died of cancer at age 86.

References

External links

 Database Football
 AP obituary 
 

1921 births
2008 deaths
American football ends
Montreal Alouettes players
New York Giants players
Ole Miss Rebels football coaches
Ole Miss Rebels football players
North Carolina Tar Heels football players
Eastern Conference Pro Bowl players
United States Marine Corps personnel of World War II
United States Marines
People from Gloster, Mississippi
Deaths from cancer in Mississippi
Players of American football from Mississippi